Ritli Hill (‘Halm Ritli’ \'h&lm 'rit-li\) is a rocky hill rising to 45 m on the south coast of western Livingston Island in the South Shetland Islands, Antarctica. It surmounts Juturna Lake on the west. The area was visited by early 19th century sealers.

The hill is named after the rock formation of Ritlite in western Bulgaria.

Location

Maps
 Península Byers, Isla Livingston. Mapa topográfico a escala 1:25000. Madrid: Servicio Geográfico del Ejército, 1992.
 L.L. Ivanov. Antarctica: Livingston Island and Greenwich, Robert, Snow and Smith Islands. Scale 1:120000 topographic map.  Troyan: Manfred Wörner Foundation, 2009.

References
 Ritli Hill. SCAR Composite Gazetteer of Antarctica.
 Bulgarian Antarctic Gazetteer. Antarctic Place-names Commission. (details in Bulgarian, basic data in English)

External links
 Ritli Hill. Copernix satellite image

Hills of Livingston Island
Bulgaria and the Antarctic